The Trichosporonales are an order in the fungal class Tremellomycetes. The order contains two families and ten genera. Several species in the Trichosporonaceae are human pathogens.

References

Tremellomycetes
Basidiomycota orders